GLONASS, also known as Uragan (GRAU Index 11F654) are the first generation of Uragan satellite used as part of the Russian GLONASS radio-based satellite navigation system. Developed by Reshetnev Information Satellite Systems, it had its debut launch on 12 October 1982, with the last launched unit on 25 December 2005 and the retirement of the last unit Kosmos 2403 on 30 April 2009. It has been superseded by the GLONASS-M (GRAU Index 11F654M), the second-generation satellites.

Design 
It used a 3-axis stabilized pressurized bus with two solar panels, a propulsion module and a payload module. It weighs  generates 1000W of power and had a limited design life of 3 years, but it was extended to 5 years in later models. It had a strict requirement of keeping the internal temperature at ±1 °C. The previous design used an embedded liquid cooling system that weighted . The Uragan implemented a gaseous cooling system that put most of the heat generating parts on the outside of the pressure vessel, simplifying the system and weighing just .

The Uragan-M are usually launched in trios, and due to the close distance, the radios of the three would interfere with each other, meaning that the ground segment can only command one satellite at a time. Setting sun pointing attitude for power and then Earth pointing attitude for communications for a single unit takes about 5 hours. Since the radio contact window with ground control is between 4 and 6 hours, ground control can not control all spacecraft in a single pass. The onboard computer in the Uragan-M can put the spacecraft in sun pointing mode autonomously, and does many of the start up processes so the ground segment can take control and process the Earth pointing mode.
  
The payload consisted of 3 L-Band navigation signals in 25 channels separated by 0.5625 MHz intervals in 2 frequency bands: 1602.5625 - 1615.5 MHz and 1240 - 1260 MHz. EIRP 25 to 27 dBW. Right hand circular polarized. It transmits the FDMA signals L1OF, L1SF and L2SF. It uses 2 Cs clocks with a clock stability of 5x10−13. And includes retroreflector for accurate orbit assessment by laser ranging.

Versions
The first generation Uragan spacecraft were created under ban of foreign radiation-hardened components and thus had an inferior expected design life of just 1 year. Throughout the years the design was gradually improved to last up to 5 years:
 Uragan Block I: First batch of 10 satellites. Only has an expected design life of 1 year, but averaged 14 months. Where launched between 1982 and 1985.
 Uragan Block IIa: Second batch of 9 satellites. Same design life as Block I, but averaged 17 months. Added new time and frequency standards and improved clock stability by an order of magnitude. Launched between 1985 and 1989.
 Uragan Block IIb: Third batch of 12 satellite. Had a 2-year design life time and averaged 22 months. Two launch failures meant that only 6 were operational. Launched between 1987 and 1988.
 Uragan Block IIv: The most numerous batch of the Uragan design, it had 56 units built and launched. The initial design life was 3 years but later enhancements on radiation hardening increased that to 5 years. Launched between 1988 and 2005.
 Uragan Block III: Transitional to GLONASS-M version with new flight control and power systems. This version was incorrectly named Uragan-M in a RIA Novosti news message issued days before the launch. When contacted by Novosti Kosmonavtiki magazine Roscosmos spokesman said all three launched satellites were first generation versions but one of them featured new upgraded flight control and power systems. The official design life was declared to be 5 years. Novosti Kosmonavtiki also pointed out the fact that GLONASS-M project had been approved on August 20, 2001, just three months before Kosmos 2382 launch. Only one Block III satellite with manufacturer number No.11L was produced.

Block I, II, and III nomenclature was introduced in Western publications. In Russian publications both Block I and II are known as 11F654 while Block III is known as 14F17.

GLONASS launches

Satellites by version

References 

GLONASS satellites
Satellite constellations